The 1890 Mid Durham by-election was held on 17 July 1890 after the death of the incumbent Liberal-Labour MP William Crawford.  The seat was retained by the Liberal-Labour candidate John Wilson.

References 

Durham, Mid
July 1890 events
1890 elections in the United Kingdom
1890 in England
19th century in County Durham